Scott H. DeLisi (born 1953) is the former United States Ambassador to Uganda. On January 24, 2012, President Obama nominated DeLisi as ambassador to Uganda.

Career
A career foreign service officer, DeLisi was previously United States Ambassador to Nepal and Eritrea and Deputy Chief of Mission of the American Embassy in Botswana. He also served in India, Madagascar, Pakistan, and Sri Lanka as well as various postings in Washington D.C. 
Ambassador DeLisi is a graduate of the University of Minnesota and the University of Minnesota Law School. 
A native of Minnesota, DeLisi speaks French and Urdu.

References

External links
https://www.facebook.com/USMissionUganda
Facebook
Twitter

|-

|-

1953 births
Living people
Ambassadors of the United States to Eritrea
Ambassadors of the United States to Nepal
Ambassadors of the United States to Uganda
People from Saint Paul, Minnesota
University of Minnesota Law School alumni
United States Foreign Service personnel
21st-century American diplomats